This list of episodes of Conan details information on the 2020 episodes of Conan, a television program on TBS hosted by Conan O'Brien.

2020

January

February

March

April

May

June

July

August

September

October

November

December

References

Conan (talk show)
Lists of variety television series episodes
Impact of the COVID-19 pandemic on television
2020-related lists